Pembroke Airport  is located  northwest of the city of Pembroke, Ontario, Canada.

Pem-Air operated regularly scheduled air service between Pembroke Airport and Toronto for 31 years, ending its scheduled operation in December, 2000.

GO Air Express operated briefly from November 2002 to April 2003. with flights to Toronto.

Since 2003 there has been no full-time tenant, but the airport is used by Ministry of Natural Resources (Ontario) water bombers.

References

Certified airports in Ontario
Pembroke, Ontario
Transport in Renfrew County
Buildings and structures in Renfrew County